Kenneth Gustaf Forslund (born 14 May 1967) is a Swedish social democratic politician who has been a member of the Swedish Riksdag since 2002 and First Deputy Speaker of the Riksdag since 2022. Prior to taking the latter office, Forslund headed the Riksdag Foreign Policy Committee, and was the spokesperson on foreign aid and foreign policy in the Social Democratic party.

Kenneth G. Forslund is representing the electoral district of Västra Götaland County West. He is originally a communications officer.

In the social democratic party Kenneth G. Forslund is in charge of the foreign aid portfolio. He is also the President of the party district in Bohuslän.

Kenneth G. Forslund was in charge of the process leading to "The Agenda for Global Development", describing the party's aid policies.

He is often contributing as a commentator and an analyst in both Swedish and international media.

On 23 September 2022 it was announced that he would be nominated as speaker of the Parliament by the Social Democratic party for the period 2022-2026. He was elected First Deputy Speaker on 26 September.

References

Kenneth G Forslund (S)

|-

|-

|-

1967 births
Living people
Members of the Riksdag 2002–2006
Members of the Riksdag 2006–2010
Members of the Riksdag 2010–2014
Members of the Riksdag 2014–2018
Members of the Riksdag 2018–2022
Members of the Riksdag from the Social Democrats
Members of the Riksdag 2022–2026